Byron Vreeland (1844-1889) was an American architect practicing in Bozeman and Miles City, Montana, where he pioneered the profession.

Life
Vreeland's early life and education are unknown, though he was trained as an architect. In the late 1870s he and his brother, builder Frank W. Vreeland, arrived in Bozeman. The two brothers established the firm of B. & F. W. Vreeland, architects and builders. By 1882 Frank W. Vreeland had retired from the firm, and was replaced by Herman Kemna. Simultaneously with this event, Vreeland relocated to Miles City, then a boomtown. Vreeland & Kemna operated until 1887, when Vreeland returned to Bozeman and Kemna went to Helena. He died in 1889.

At least two of Vreeland's works have been placed on the National Register of Historic Places, and several others contribute to at least three listed historic districts.

Architectural works

B. & F. W. Vreeland, until 1882
 1880 - Gallatin County Courthouse, 311 W Main St, Bozeman, Montana
 Demolished
 1880 - Masonic Temple, 137 E Main St, Bozeman, Montana

Vreeland & Kemna, 1882-1887
 1883 - Palace Saloon, 135 E Main St, Bozeman, Montana
 1884 - Fred A. Fielding House, 420 S Willson Ave, Bozeman, Montana
 1886 - Nelson Story House, 404 W Main St, Bozeman, Montana
 Demolished
 1887 - Bozeman City Hall and Opera House, E Main St & S Rouse Ave, Bozeman, Montana
 Demolished in 1964

Byron Vreeland, 1882-1889
 1882 - First National Bank Building, 519 Main St, Miles City, Montana
 Demolished in 1910
 1882 - Walrond S. Snell House, 402 S Lake Ave, Miles City, Montana
 1884 - Custer County Courthouse, 1010 Main St, Miles City, Montana
 Demolished in 1949
 1885 - Commercial Block, 511 Main St, Miles City, Montana
 1885 - Leighton & Jordan Block, 500 Main St, Miles City, Montana
 1886 - Byron Vreeland House, 707 Washington St, Miles City, Montana
 The architect's own residence
 1886 - White Sulphur Springs School, S Central Ave, White Sulphur Springs, Montana
 Demolished
 1886 - Emmanuel Episcopal Church, 208 N 8th St, Miles City, Montana
 1887 - E. H. Johnson House, 1005 Palmer St, Miles City, Montana
 1889 - Barnett Building, 13 E Main St, Bozeman, Montana

References

1844 births
1889 deaths
19th-century American architects
Architects from Montana
People from Bozeman, Montana
People from Miles City, Montana